Rochebrunia is a genus of small operculate land snails, terrestrial gastropod mollusks in the family Pomatiidae.

Species
 Rochebrunia bentiana (Melvill, 1895)
 Rochebrunia bourguignati Neubert, 2009
 Rochebrunia clausa (G. B. Sowerby I, 1843)
 Rochebrunia dhofarense (Melvill & Ponsonby, 1896)
 Rochebrunia guillaini (Petit de la Saussaye, 1850)
 Rochebrunia hinduorum (W. T. Blanford, 1864)
 Rochebrunia milneedwardsi (Bourguignat, 1881)
 Rochebrunia obtusa (L. Pfeiffer, 1862)
 Rochebrunia perrieri (Bourguignat, 1881)

References

 Pallary, P. (1925). Notes on some terrestrial mollusca from the hinterland of Makalla, South Arabia. In: Little, O.H.: The geography and geology of Makalla, South Arabia: , 224–234, pl. 35. Cairo (Government Press)
 Bank, R. A. (2017). Classification of the Recent terrestrial Gastropoda of the World. Last update: July 16, 2017.
 Neubert, E. (2009). The continental malacofauna of Arabia and adjacent areas. VI. Pomatiidae of Arabia, Socotra and northeast Africa, with descriptions of new genera and species (Gastropoda: Caenogastropoda: Littorinoidea). Fauna of Arabia, 24: 47–127. Riyadh / Basel [

External links
 Bourguignat, J.-R. (1881). Mollusques terrestres et fluviatiles recueillis en Afrique dans le pays des Çomalis Medjourtin, 1-15. Saint-Germain (D. Bardin)

Pomatiidae
Gastropod genera